The Player of the Month is a soccer award that recognizes the best North American Soccer League player each month of the season. The recipient is chosen by a panel of writers who cover the league. The award was first given in 2011, the North American Soccer League's inaugural season.

Winners

Multiple winners
The below table lists those who have won on more than one occasion.

Awards won by position
As of October 9, 2016

Awards won by nationality
As of October 9, 2016

Awards won by club
As of October 9, 2016

References

Player of the Month